Tangle is an Australian drama series for the Showcase subscription television channel. It focuses on the tangled lives of two generations of two families. Tangle is filmed in Melbourne and first screened on 1 October 2009. It is written by Fiona Seres, Tony McNamara and Judi McCrossin, and directed by Jessica Hobbs, Matthew Saville and Stuart McDonald. There were three seasons.

Plot

Season 1
Tangle revolves around the intertwined lives of the Kovac and Williams families and their network of friends and extended family in and around Kew in Melbourne. Nat Manning (Kat Stewart) returned to her home town of Melbourne after ten years in the United Kingdom on the minor celebrity circuit. She created ripples and then waves in the lives of two clans already struggling under the weight of their myriad secrets. Ally (Justine Clarke) is the devoted wife of an aggressive and arrogant builder Vince (Ben Mendelsohn), mother of Romeo and Gigi (Lincoln Younes and Eva Lazarro), who is happy to have her sister Nat back. Politician Tim (Joel Tobeck), now a rising star in the State Parliament of Victoria, had an affair 15 years ago with Nat, and as a result, Nat became pregnant and gave birth to Max, now 15. Tim and his wife Christine (Catherine McClements) patched up their marriage and fought hard for custody of Max (Blake Davis) and do not welcome her return to their lives. Ally’s husband Vince is having an affair with divorcee Em, and his friend, a doctor Gabriel (Matt Day) has a secret lust for Ally. Vince is unexpectedly killed in a random auto accident. 

Meanwhile, the older children, who attend the same school, are bound together when Max finds the dead body of a runner, who we see stumbling off the road at Yarra Bend in Melbourne and fatally hitting his head. Rather than report the death to the police, Max texts a photo to his friends, and they take the man's wallet and keys, visit his house at night over several days, until they are found there by the police and heavily cautioned. Romeo and his friend, also the son of a state politician, cut of one of the man's fingers a trophy, and Romeo hides it. His little sister finds it, informs on her brother, thus implicating the parents in the coverup. A scandal is not what parent Tim needs, as he becomes a prominent public figure as State Minister for Health.

Season 2
With Vince now gone, Vince’s secretive brother Joe Kovac (Kick Gurry) returns hoping to become a part of a family he was never allowed into. Spiros Georgiades (Don Hany) is recruited by the party as a political adviser to Tim, and develops an attraction to Christine. Tim makes a bid for the top job of Premier, but is kicked out of the party after an honest press conference. Ally and her children, Romeo and Gigi, make a fresh start in a new house. Nat meets a young, successful man and Gabriel's new outgoing girlfriend Sophie looks a lot like Ally (according to Nat).

Season 3
Ally sheds some of love's illusions and begins to see life possibilities beyond her family and Gabriel. Both Romeo and Gigi need her less than she'd imagined, but in different ways, as they build their own lives. When Max moves away, Christine flirts with a parallel life at odds with all previous certainties. Gabriel and Ally finally get together as Nat reconnects with the sinister Michael Chubbievsky, a suspected drug dealer. Nat's chaos is the one constant.

Cast

Main cast

Supporting cast
 Tony Rickards – Billy Hall
 Jane Allsop – Tanya Hicks
 Lucia Emmerichs – Ophelia Hicks
 Reef Ireland – Ned Dougherty
 Madeleine Jay – Kelly
 Alison Whyte – Nicky Barnham
 Maude Davey – Agatha

Season 1
 John Brumpton – Bryan Dougherty
 Frank Gallacher – Pat Mahady
 Alicia Banit – Leah
 Simon Maiden – Stan/Voice of Yuri

Season 2
 Adam Zwar – Huey Moss
 Leah Vandenberg – Elle Rosenthal
 Todd MacDonald – Paul
 Tim Draxl – Conrad
 Fiona Harris – Sophie
 Ryan Corr – Isaac

Season 3
 Dan Wyllie – Michael Chubievsky
 Michael Clarke-Tokely – Luke Wintle
 Elle Mandalis – Miss Papas
 Nicholas Bell – Sean Roscoe
 Ben Schumann – Harvey

Notable guest cast
 Luke Hemsworth – John (2 episodes, 2009)
 Kate Jenkinson – Melanie (5 episodes, 2009–12)
 Lliam Amor – Robert Barker (2 episodes, 2009)
 Tony Nikolakopoulos – Gordon (3 episodes, 2009–10)
 Richard Sutherland – Jason (1 episode, 2009)
 Marta Kaczmarek – Psychic (1 episode, 2010)
 Alin Sumarwata – Julie (1 episode, 2010)
 Kevin Harrington – Ian (1 episode, 2012)
 John Flaus – Cemetery Keeper (1 episode, 2012)
 Jason Agius - Romeo Fighter Mate (1 episode, 2012)

Production
Showcase renewed Tangle for a third series on 12 December 2010 and production began in June 2011, ending in August.

Tangle is filmed in and around the city of Melbourne, usually set within the more affluent suburbs of the city. The new house in which Ally and her children move to in season three is in Black Rock, and Tim and Christine's house is in Kew. Some other locations that have been used to film throughout the series are:
Studley Park
Yarra Bend Park
Prahran
Abbotsford Convent
Parliament House
Hotel Windsor (Melbourne)
Spring Street
Carlton
Abbotsford
North Melbourne
Malvern East (Ally's house in Series 1)
Camberwell (Nazareth House, Cornell St Camberwell - Romeo's school)

Broadcast
Australia
 SoHo
Republic of Ireland 
 RTÉ Two
Asia Pacific (numerous countries)
 Australia Network
New Zealand
 TV One
Poland
 Viacom Blink!
Canada
 Super Channel
United Kingdom
 Amazon Prime Video (available from 5 April 2019), and STV Player.
United States
Amazon Prime Video
Netflix Australia (2023)

DVD Releases

Awards and nominations

References

External links
 
 Tangle on 7plus
 Tangle on 10Play

Showcase (Australian TV channel) original programming
Australian drama television series
2009 Australian television series debuts
2012 Australian television series endings
Television series by Endemol Australia
English-language television shows
Television shows set in Melbourne